Provisional Revolutionary Government may refer to:

 Provisional Revolutionary Government of Cibao, formed on July 7, 1857
 Provisional Revolutionary Government of the Republic of South Vietnam, formed on June 8, 1969
 Interim Government of Iran (1979), also known as the Provisional Revolutionary Government
 The legislature of the Lithuanian Soviet Socialist Republic (1918–19)
 The government of Brazil headed by Getúlio Vargas, 1930–1934
 The government of Hungary led by János Kádár, 1956
 Provisional Revolutionary Government of the Workers and Peasants of the Ukraine